The South East Asian Mathematics Competition (SEAMC) is an annual three-day non-profit mathematics competition for Southeast Asian students at different grade levels. It is a qualifying competition organized by Eunoia Ventures for invitation to the World Mathematics Championships. 

Teams have participated from China, Thailand, Hong Kong, Malaysia, Singapore, Brunei, Vietnam, Cambodia, and Nepal.

Host venue locations of the SEAMC changes annually. An online version was held due to the COVID-19 Pandemic.

Eligibility 

 The Senior Competition is open to all students in Grade 12 (Year 13) or younger. 
 The Junior Competition is open to all students in Grade 9 (Year 10) or younger. 
 The Secondary Competition is open to all students in Grade 7 (Year 8) or younger during the month of the event and 
 Primary level for Grade 5 (Year 6) or younger.

The competition

History
SEAMC is a mathematics collaboration experience for school students located in South or North East Asia to come together for 2-3 days.

SEAMC was conceived of by Steve Warry, who taught at Alice Smith School in Kuala Lumpur. He organised SEAMC in March 2001. He died one week prior to the first competition. Teams competed for the Warry Cup, which is named in Steve's honour.

From 2014, the NEAMC sister event has been organised for students in Northeast Asia. The organizers enlisted the Nanjing International School to host it initially in February 2014 with the help of Malcolm Coad.

In 2017, the SNEAMC family of events became the World Mathematics Championships.

Format
Each school enters teams of 3 students each. The competition has nine rounds.

All WMC qualifying competitions have:
 3 days of engagement
 9 equally weighted rounds
 6 skills categories for prizes
 The best sum ranking across all 9 rounds win

School teams engage within the Communication skills rounds.

The Collaboration skills rounds (Open, Lightning and Innovation) are in buddy teams of three.
The Challenge are skills rounds undertaken as individuals.

Three skills rounds are (subject specific skills and procedures) knowledge based,
three are (plan and execute) strategy focused and three depend upon (new and imaginative ideas) creativity.

So each strategy, creative and knowledge skill category is engaged in alone, in school teams and in buddy teams.

Past questions can be found around the web.

In many SEAMC competitions, there are initial icebreaker events.

Prizes
 All participants receive a transcript of relative attainment in each of the 9 rounds.
 The highest ranked individuals in each category receive medals.
 The highest ranked individuals across all 9 rounds receive medals.
 The best ranked school team across all 9 rounds receive a respectively named Cup (for the SEAMC Junior competition, this is the original Warry Cup).
The better ranked teams across all of the competition venues that year are invited to the ultimate World Mathematics Championships showdown, hosted by Trinity College, University of Melbourne in the following July each year.

Results

Past team winners 
 2020 - UWCSEA East, Singapore
 2019 - British School Manila, Philippines
 2018 - British School Manila, Philippines; Saigon South International School Ho Chi Minh City, Vietnam
 2017 - British School Manila, Philippines (Senior), Singapore American School, Singapore (Junior)
 2016 - British International School Ho Chi Minh City, Vietnam 
 2015 - Singapore Chinese School, Singapore
 2014 - Hong Kong International School, Hong Kong
 2013 - Chinese International School, Hong Kong
 2012 - Chinese International School, Hong Kong
 2011 - West Island School, Hong Kong
 2010 - British International School, Vietnam (Jaeho Han, Cheewon Oh, Jungmin Kang)
 2009 - German Swiss International School, Hong Kong
 2008 - UWCSEA Dover, Singapore
 2007 - KGV, Hong Kong, China
 2006 - KGV, Hong Kong, China
 2005 - Island School, Hong Kong, China
 2004 - Island School, Hong Kong, China
 2003 - Garden IS, Kuala Lumpur
 2002 - Island School, Hong Kong, China
 2001 - South Island School, Hong Kong, China

World Mathematics Championship June 2018 Results 
Senior Level
Winner : Julian Yu
Runner Up : Yan Pui Matthew Ling
Runner Up : Wye Yew Ho
Runner Up : Kevin Xin
Runner Up : Linda Wang

Junior Level
Winner : Seung Jae Yang
Runner Up : Arunav Maheshwari
Runner Up : Jangju Lee
Runner Up : Ryusuke Suehiro
Runner Up : Ravi Bahukhandi
Runner Up : Soumyaditya Choudhuri
Runner Up : Tanai Chotanphuti

World Mathematics Championship December 2018 Results 
Winner : Palis Pisuttisarun
Runner Up : Ho Wang Tang
Runner Up : Byung Hoo Park
Runner Up : Rocco Jiang

Past individual winners 
 2020 - This has not been held yet due to the COVID-19 pandemic.
 2019 - Andrew Chang, Singapore American School, Singapore
 2018 - Juhee (Jessie) Hong, Singapore American School, Singapore
 2017 - Tiffany Ong, British School Manila; Rahul Arya, King George V School
 2016 - Otto Winata, Sampoerna Academy Medan, Indonesia
 2015 - Alex Lee, Taipei European School, Taipei
 2014 - Tie between Kyung Chan Lee, Garden International School, Kuala Lumpur, and Michael Wu, Hong Kong International School, Hong Kong
 2013 - Joanna Cheng, South Island School, Hong Kong
 2012 - Charles Meng, Chinese International School, Hong Kong
 2011 - Alexander Cooke, South Island School, Hong Kong
 2010 - Ki Yun Kim, JIS, Indonesia
 2009 - Joon Young Lee, ISB, China
 2008 - Dong Wook Chung, UWCSEA, Singapore
 2007 - Oliver Huang, KGV, Hong Kong
 2006 - En Seng Ng, SAS, Singapore
 2005 - Tiffany Lau, Island School, Hong Kong
 2004 - Otto Chan, Island School, Hong Kong
 2003 - Ernest Chia, Garden IS, Kuala Lumpur
 2002 - Ernest Chia, Garden IS, Kuala Lumpur
 2001 - John Chan, WIS, Hong Kong

References

External links 

 Official website of Eunoia Ventures

Mathematics competitions
Recurring events established in 2001